This is a list of former Australian Rules Football competitions in the Australian state of Western Australia.

Carnivals
 Eastern Districts Football Carnival
Held annually between competitions in the southern part of the state. Held in early September, it often interrupts the local competitions' finals series.
 
Winners:

1928 Northam
1929 
1930 
1931 
1932 
1933 
1934 
1935 

1936 
1937 
1938 
1939 
1940–1945 not held
1946  
1947 
1948  

1949 
1950 
1951 
1952
1953 
1954

 Great Southern Football Carnival
Held annually between competitions in the southern part of the state. It is held in early September, often interrupting the local competitions finals series.
 
Winners:

1922 Albany
1923 Katanning
1924 Katanning
1925 Albany
1926 Katanning
1927 Narrogin
1928 Katanning
1929 Katanning

1930 Narrogin
1931 Narrogin
1932 Albany
1933 Narrogin
1934 Albany
1935 Albany
1936 Tambellup
1937 Wagin

1938 Wagin
1939 Wagin
1940–1945 not held
1946 Dumbleyung-Lake Grace 
1947 Albany
1948 Dumbleyung-Lake Grace 
1949 Albany
1950 Albany

1951 Katanning
1952 Albany
1953 Katanning
1954 Wagin

Associations
 Albany Football Association (1897–1957)
 Clubs included East Ward>East Albany>Railways, North Ward>Towns>North Albany, West Ward>West Albany>AIT>Royals
 Avon Valley Association (1898–1958)
 Clubs included York, Beverley, Meckering, Northam Federals, Northam Towns, Northam Union, Toodyay
 Bruce Rock Football Association (1926–1959)
 Clubs included Ardath-Babakin, Belka, Bruce Rock, Bruce Rock Magpies, Bruce Rock Rovers, Imperials, Kwolyin, Muntadgin, Narenbeen, Narenbeen Rovers, Narenbeen Warriors, Shackleton, Towns
 Bunbury Football Association (1902–1952)
 Clubs included Brunswick, Bunbury, Donnybrook, Lumpers, Pastimes, South Bunbury, Yarloop
 Busselton Football Association (1910–1953)
 Clubs Included Busselton, Capel, Elgin, Lumpers, Pastimes, Railways, Ruabon, Stratham, Wanderers, West Brunswick.
 Coastal Football Association (1972–1991)
 Clubs Included Cervantes, Dongara, Eneabba, Jurien Bay, Leeway
 Corrigin Football Association (1921–1970)
 Clubs included Bendering, Bilbarin, Brookton, Bullaring, Bulyee, Corrigin, Corrigin Tigers, Dudinin, Gnerkadilling, Gorge Rock, Karlgarin, Kondinin, Kulin, Pengilly, West Bendering, Yealering, Yealering/Bullaring Rovers.
 Central Midlands Football Association
 Clubs included Rovers, Warriors, Miling, Watheroo.
 Dalwallinu Football Association
 Clubs included Ballidu, Buntine, Dalwallinu, Latham, Miamoon, Wubin
 Dampier Football Association (1913–1970)
 Clubs Included  Bencubbin, Kununoppin, Mukinbudin. Nungarin, Trayning,  Yelbeni
 Denmark Football Association
 Clubs included  Colts, Rangers, Wanderers
 Donnybrook Football Association (1919-1954)
 Clubs included: Argyle, Beelerup, Kirup, Donnybrook, Boyanup, Dardanup, Noggerup, Wanderers
 Dumbleyung Lake Grace Association
 Clubs included Kukerin, Moulyinning, Dumbleyung, Lake Grace.
 East Avon Football Association
 Clubs included Quairaiding, Cunderdin, Tammin, Kellerberrin, Meckering, Yorkrakine.
 Geraldton Football Association
 Clubs included Fire Brigade, Rovers, Railway, Towns
 Exmouth Football Association
 Harvey Football Association
 Clubs included: Brunswick, Harvey, Mornington, Woroona, Yarloop
 Harvey-Brunswick Football Association
 Clubs included: Brunswick, Harvey, Mornington, Wokalup, Yarloop
 Irwin Football Association (1946–1959)
 Clubs included Dongara, Mingenew, Walkaway, Yandanoola
 Katanning Football Association 
 Clubs included Wanderers, Imperials, Rovers, Kent. Kojonup, Woodanilling, Katanning.
 Koorda Football Association 
 Clubs included Gabbin, Cadoux, Boorallaining.
 Merrerin Football Association
 Clubs included Towns, Railways, Baandee, Nukarni, Burracoppin.
 Mt Barker Football Association
 Clubs included Rocky Gully, North Mt. Barker, Mt. Barker South, Cranbrook.
 Mullewa Football Association (1920–1962)
 Clubs included Federals, Devils Creek, Railways, Rovers.
 Murray Districts Football League.
 Club included Pinjarra, Waroona, Mandurah, Hills, United, Jarrahdale, Yarloop.
 Narrogin Football Association
 Clubs included: Cuballing, Imperials, Towns, Railways, Williams, Boddington.
 Nelson Football Association
 Clubs included Balingup, Boyup Brook, Bridgetown, Rovers, Bridgetown Warriors, Nunnup, Greenbushes.
 New Norcia Association.
 Norseman Football Association
 Clubs included Towns, Tigers, Rovers.
 Northampton-Upper Chapman Football Association
 Clubs included Towns, Rovers, Yuna, Nabawa, Naason.
 Northern Goldfield Football Association
 Clubs included Leonora, Gwalia
 North Midlands Football Association
 Clubs included Coorow, Camamah, Three Springs, Arrino.
 Perenjori - Morowa Football Association.
  Clubs included Morawa, Perenjori, Merkanooka, Gutha, Caron, Koolanooka, Bowgada
 Pingelly-Brookton Football Association
 Clus included Pingelly, Brookton, Aldersyde, Kweda, Popanyinning, Pumphrys Wandering
 Southern Districts Football League (1959-1991)
 Clubs included: Cranbrook, North Mt Barker, South Mt Barker, North Albany, Railways, Royals, Tambellup
 Perth Suburban Football Association (1922–1937)
 Clubs included Bassendeen, Belmont, Canning Districts, West Subiaco, Young Labour League.
 South Midlands Football Association
 Clubs included Bindoon, Bullbrook, Gingin, Muchea
 South Suburban Football Association (1908– )
 Armadale, Cannington, Gosnell, Kelsmott, Manningham.
 Tambellup Football Association 
 Clubs included Borden, Broomehill, Gnowangerup, Ongerup, Tambellup
 Victoria Plains Football Association.
 Clubs included Callingiri Yericoin, Bolgart, Toodyay
 Warren Football Association
 Clubs included Jardee, Deanmill, Pemberton, Palgarup, Manjimup.
 Wickerpin Football Association (1946–1959)
 Clubs included: Dudinin, Harrismith, Malyalling, Toolibin, Wickepin, Yealering.
 Wiluna Association
 Clubs included Rovers, United.
 Wyalkatchem Football Association
 Clubs included Benjabbering, Korrielockering, Wyalkatchem
 Yilgarn Football Association
 Clubs included: Bullfinch, Fire Brigades, Marvel Loch, Miners, Mt Palmer, Rovers, South Yilgarn, Towns, Unions, United, Westonia

References

Australian rules football competitions in Western Australia
Lists of sports events in Australia
History of sport in Australia